The Pheu Thai Party (PTP; ,) is the third incarnation of a Thai political party founded by former prime minister Thaksin Shinawatra. The Pheu Thai Party was founded on 20 September 2007, as an anticipated replacement for the People's Power Party (PPP), which the Constitutional Court of Thailand dissolved less than three months later after finding party members guilty of electoral fraud. The People's Power Party was itself a replacement for Thaksin's original Thai Rak Thai Party (TRT), dissolved by the Court in May 2007 for violation of electoral laws. , Pheu Thai had 22,771 members.

History

Formation and opposition years (2008–2011)
The PPP was dissolved by the Constitutional Court of Thailand on 2 December 2008. On 3 December 2008, the majority of the former PPP MPs defected to the Pheu Thai Party. In a PTP general assembly, the first executive commission was elected on 7 December 2008. Candidates for the party's leader were: Yongyuth Wichaidit, Apiwan Wiriyachai, former Vice President of the House of Representatives, former health minister Chalerm Yubamrung and former industry minister Mingkwan Saengsuwan. Yongyuth Wichaidit was elected as the party's leader.

In a December 2008 parliamentary session, MPs of five PPP coalition parties decided to endorse Abhisit Vejjajiva as the next prime minister and themselves forming a Democrat-led coalition. The PTP campaigned for their endorsement by the PPP-coalition parties. However, Abhisit had gained their support for the premiership. After that, the party called for a national unity government in which all parties would be involved, with Sanoh Thienthong of the Pracharaj Party as the new premier. This proposal was rejected by the defecting coalition parties and the Democrat Party. On 11 December, Worrawat Eua-apinyakul, then MP for Phrae from PTP, suggested that the party should push for a house dissolution and general elections, with the hope of depriving the prospective coalition of a parliamentary majority. However, The President of the House of Representatives; Chai Chidchob spoke against the plan.

On 15 December 2008, the party elected Pracha Promnok as the party's candidate for prime minister and has since been in opposition to prime minister Abhisit Vejjajiva's coalition government. As an opposition, the party received a rating of 3.75 out of 10 by a majority of respondents in a nationwide survey conducted on 24 and 25 December 2010, by Bangkok University.

In early May 2011, Charupong Ruangsuwan was named new Secretary general of the party. Following the discovery of illegal timber by Thai authorities, during an August 2014 search at Charupong's son's Mae Hong Son Province resort for buried war weapons and other illegal items, the media reported that both Charupong and his son were no longer present in Thailand.

In government (2011–2014)
In the 2011 general election, the Pheu Thai Party contested for the first time since its foundation. On 16 May, Thaksin's youngest sister Yingluck Shinawatra was nominated head of PTP's party-list proportional representation and contender of prime minister Abhisit. One of her main issues in the campaign was national reconciliation. The election was expected to be a neck-and-neck contest between Pheu Thai and the ruling Democrats. Unexpectedly, the party won 265 of 500 seats in the House of Representatives on 3 July. Prime Minister Abhisit Vejjajiva acknowledged Pheu Thai's success in the election, and congratulated Yingluck Shinawatra as Thailand's first female prime minister. Despite its absolute majority, the winning party announced that it would form a coalition government with five minor parties. On 5 August, Yingluck was elected prime minister with 296 votes in favour. The election was approved and Yingluck was formally appointed by the king on 8 August.

Pheu Thai Party Prime Ministers

Election results

References

External links
 Official website
 Thailand's July Election: Understanding the Outcome, Q&A with Catharin Dalpino (July 2011)
 East Asia Forum: "The changing face of Thai populism" (June 2013)

 
2008 establishments in Thailand
Neoliberal parties
Political parties established in 2008
Political parties in Thailand
Populist parties
Progressive parties